Edouard Barbey (2 September 1831, Béziers – 26 March 1905, Paris) was a French politician. He also served in the French Navy from 1849 to 1862, leaving with the rank of lieutenant. He was also French Naval Minister in 1887 and from 1889 to 1892.

Sources 
http://www.senat.fr/senateur-3eme-republique/barbey_edouard1693r3.html

1831 births
1905 deaths
People from Béziers
French Navy officers
French Naval Ministers
Senators of Tarn (department)